Kenneth S. Deffeyes was a geologist who worked with M. King Hubbert, the creator of the Hubbert peak theory, at the Shell Oil Company research laboratory in Houston, Texas.  He claimed Chickasaw ancestry.

Deffeyes made a lively personal impression. McPhee characterized him in Basin and Range (1981): "Deffeyes is a big man with a tenured waistline. His hair flies behind him like Ludwig van Beethoven. He lectures in sneakers. His voice is syllabic, elocutionary, operatic. ... His surname rhymes with 'the maze.'"

Biography
Deffeyes earned a B.S. in petroleum geology from the Colorado School of Mines and a Ph.D. in geology from Princeton University, studying under F.B. van Houten.

Deffeyes Ph.D. dissertation research concerned volcanic ashfalls in Nevada that had been altered to zeolites. Not much was known about the potential uses of zeolites, so Deffeyes wrote a review paper on zeolites in sedimentary rocks. This resulted (according to both Deffeyes and John McPhee) in the founding of the natural zeolite industry.  Zeolites have important uses in  water purification, as catalysts in the petrochemical industry, and as molecular sieves.

He taught at Princeton from 1967 to 1998, when he transferred to professor emeritus status.

He was the author of Hubbert's Peak, published in 2001. In 2005 he published the book Beyond Oil: The View from Hubbert's Peak. On February 11, 2006 Deffeyes claimed that world oil production had peaked on December 16, 2005.

In non-fiction
In John McPhee's 1981 book Basin and Range, about the origin of Basin and Range topography, Deffeyes teaches geology to McPhee and his readers by analyzing road cuts and the exposed geologic strata that resulted from the construction of Interstate highway 80.  On one trip, Deffeyes picks up a piece of Triassic shale near Paterson, New Jersey to demonstrate a common geologic field test: he puts the shale in his mouth and chews it. "If it's gritty, it's a silt bed, and if it's creamy it's a shale," Deffeyes said. McPhee tries it and reports that he wouldn't "have thought to put it in coffee."

Quotes
 "Crude oil is much too valuable to be burned as a fuel."
 Of world peak oil production: "There is nothing plausible that could postpone the peak until 2009. Get used to it."
 "The economists all think that if you show up at the cashier's cage with enough currency, God will put more oil in ground."

See also

Other peak oil advocates
 Colin Campbell
 Jean Laherrère
 Dale Allen Pfeiffer

References

External links
Deffeyes peak oil site at Princeton

1931 births
2017 deaths
American geologists
American non-fiction environmental writers
Colorado School of Mines alumni
Princeton University alumni
People from Oklahoma City